The State of Washington Sports Hall of Fame is a sports hall of fame honoring athletes associated with the U.S. state of Washington. There have been 235 individuals inducted into the hall since 1960.

Inductees
Candidates for the State of Washington Sports Hall of Fame are nominated and voted on annually. Not every year has a class of inductees, years that do not have inductees include: 1971, 1972, 1973, 1975, 1976, 1981, 1982, 1984, 1985, 1987, 1988, 1990, 1991, 1992, 1993, 1995, 2000, 2002, 2016. 

For the 2019 class, Dan Fitzgerald, Bernie Fryer, Ken Griffey Jr., Jason Hanson, Megan Jendrick, Steve Raible, Rick Rizzs, and Sugar Ray Seales were named into the hall of fame.

The Class of 2020 inductees included Aaron Sele, Adam Morrison, Brad Walker, Dick Cartmell, Don Zech, and Joe Kearney.

Inductees to the State of Washington Sports Hall of Fame include the following:

1960s

1970s

1980s

1990s

2000s

2010s

2020s

References

External links
 Official website
 List of inductees

Sports in Washington (state)
Halls of fame in Washington (state)
Washington
All-sports halls of fame